Elizabeth Clare Simmonds (born 22 January 1991) is an English competitive swimmer who has represented Great Britain in the Olympics, FINA World Aquatics Championships, and European championships, and England in the Commonwealth Games.  She specialises in backstroke events, and is a former European champion in the 200-metre backstroke.

Simmonds represented Great Britain at the 2008 Summer Olympics in both the 100-metre and 200-metre backstroke swimming events. She also competed at the 2012 Summer Olympics in the 200-metre backstroke swimming event, coming in fourth place.

Simmonds went to secondary school in Lincoln and trained with the Vulcans Swimming Club, later attending Loughborough University. Her early career largely coincided with that of her friend, teammate and former World champion and record holder Gemma Spofforth, with whom she shared the gold and silver medals at both the 100 and 200 metre backstroke at the 2010 European Aquatics Championships.

Personal bests and records held

External links
British Olympic Association athlete profile
British Swimming athlete profile

1991 births
Living people
Alumni of Loughborough University
English female swimmers
European Aquatics Championships medalists in swimming
Medalists at the FINA World Swimming Championships (25 m)
Olympic swimmers of Great Britain
Swimmers at the 2008 Summer Olympics
Swimmers at the 2012 Summer Olympics
Commonwealth Games medallists in swimming
Commonwealth Games silver medallists for England
Female backstroke swimmers
Swimmers at the 2010 Commonwealth Games
Sportspeople from Beverley
Swimmers at the 2014 Commonwealth Games
Medallists at the 2010 Commonwealth Games